

Top grossing films

The top 7 films released in 2011 by worldwide gross are as follows:

Releases

April–June

July–September

October–December

See also
 2011 in film
 2011 in Pakistan

References

External links
 Search Pakistani film - IMDB.com

2011
Lists of 2011 films by country or language
Films